Clepsis fucana is a species of moth of the family Tortricidae. It is found in North America, where it has been recorded from British Columbia south to California.

The length of the forewings is 6.4–10.6 mm. The ground colour of the forewings varies from dark brown to white. The hindwings are white. Adults are on wing from April to June and again from September to October in two generations per year in the southern part of the range.

The larvae feed on Scrophularia, Cynara scolymus and Stachys species. They hollow out the terminal shoots of their host plant and feed on leaves webbed to the larval shelter.

References

Moths described in 1879
Clepsis